(or simply Kawasaki) is a Japanese public multinational corporation  manufacturer of motorcycles, engines, heavy equipment, aerospace and defense equipment, rolling stock and ships, headquartered in Chūō, Kobe and Minato, Tokyo, Japan. It is also active in the production of industrial robots, gas turbines, pumps, boilers and other industrial products. The company is named after its founder, Shōzō Kawasaki.
KHI is known as one of the three major heavy industrial manufacturers of Japan, alongside Mitsubishi Heavy Industries and IHI. Prior to the Second World War, KHI was part of the Kobe Kawasaki zaibatsu, which included Kawasaki Steel and Kawasaki Kisen. After the conflict, KHI became part of the DKB Group (keiretsu).

History 

Shōzō Kawasaki, born in 1836, was involved with the marine industry from a young age. He was involved with two offshore disasters but accredited his survival to the modernization of the ships. This led to the decision to create technological innovations for the Japanese shipping industry. In 1878, after struggling to find business, his first order was placed. This is marked as the company's start in the industry.

In 1886, Kawasaki moved the business from Tokyo to Hyogo. This allowed space for the rise of orders placed to his company and the renaming to Kawasaki Dockyard. The new and improved company went public as Kawasaki Dockyard Co., Ltd when the demand for ships rose during the Sino-Japanese War of 1894. Kojiro Matsukata was announced as the company's first president.

After opening a new factory in 1906, Kawasaki began diversifying its products. They began to produce parts for the railroad, automotive, and airplane industry by the end of World War 1. After the war, along with the Allied arms-limitation agreement in 1912, Kawasaki faced a huge decline in shipbuilding. In 1929, the Depression caused a large amount of financial problems with the company.

During World War 2, Kawasaki was a major builder of combat aircraft like the Ki-61, which killed many US aircrew.  Just afterwards, they adapted air intakes from combat aircraft to high speed motorcycles.  In 1947, the government introduced a new shipbuilding agenda and gave Kawasaki a rise in profits and helped restore the company. The company was able to resume all operations and by the 1950s, Japan was leading as the world's largest shipbuilder.

By the late 1960s into the 1970s Kawasaki had begun to withdraw from the shipbuilding industry and diversified its company, producing motorcycles, jet skis, bridges, tunnel-boring machines, and aircraft. They also supplied technologically advanced railroad cars to the New York subway system.

In 1995, Kawasaki Heavy Industries came to an agreement with China to produce the largest containerships known to man. This led to the company announcing higher than expected profits in 1996. However, shortly after the profits, the company saw a long decline in business forcing them to find a solution.

With the company seeing continuous losses into the 21st century, it formed a joint venture with Ishikawajima-Harima Heavy Industries Co. However, by the end of 2001, the agreement was terminated. In the following years, Kawasaki Heavy Industries Co. have seen a fluctuation of profits and losses.

Products

Aerospace

Kawasaki is active in a diverse range of the aerospace industry. The company is a contractor for the Japanese Ministry of Defense and has built aircraft such as the C-1 transport aircraft, T-4 intermediate jet trainer, and the P-3C antisubmarine warfare patrol airplane.  Since 2007, it has built the P-1 maritime patrol aircraft, and since 2010, it has built the C-2 transport aircraft. Kawasaki also builds helicopters, including the BK117, jointly developed and manufactured with MBB.  It also produces the CH-47J / JA helicopter.

In the commercial aviation business, the company is involved in the joint international development and production of large passenger aircraft.  It is involved in joint development and production of the Boeing 767, Boeing 777 and Boeing 787 with The Boeing Company, and the 170, 175, 190 and 195 jets with Empresa Brasileira de Aeronáutica. It is also involved in the joint international development and production of turbofan engines for passenger aircraft such as the V2500, the RB211/Trent, the PW4000 and the CF34.

Kawasaki also works for the Japan Aerospace Exploration Agency. The company was responsible for the development and production of the payload fairings, payload attach fittings (PAF) and the construction of the launch complex for the H-II rocket. It continues to provide services for the H-IIA rocket.

Kawasaki has also participated in projects such as the development of reusable launch vehicles for spacecraft that will handle future space transport, space robotics projects such as the Japanese Experiment Module for the International Space Station, the cancelled HOPE-X experimental orbiting plane and the docking mechanism for the ETS-VII. According to a document from July 1997, they would have been a major manufacturer of the Kankoh-maru space tourism vehicle (also known as the Kawasaki S-1), which never saw production.

Main products
 Aircraft
 Space systems
 Helicopters
 Simulators
 Jet engines
 Missiles
 Electronic equipment

Rolling stock

Kawasaki is Japan's largest manufacturer of rolling stock. It began operations in the industry in 1906. It manufactures express and commuter trains, subway cars, freight trains, locomotives, monorails and new transit systems. Kawasaki is also involved in the development and design of high-speed trains such as Japan's Shinkansen.

Main Products
 Electric cars (including Shinkansen trains)
 Monorails
 Passenger coaches and freight cars
 Diesel locomotives
 Electric locomotives
 Platform screen door systems
 Passenger coaches and freight cars integrated transit systems

Shipbuilding

Shipbuilding is the historical industry in which Kawasaki Heavy Industries was created and developed, as from the company's 1878 founding as the Kawasaki Dockyard Co.

Kawasaki Shipbuilding Corporation is a wholly owned subsidiary of Kawasaki Heavy Industries. Its product range include high-performance LNG and LPG carriers, container ships, bulk carriers and VLCCs, as well as submarines. The company is also involved in the development of offshore structures and research vessels.

Kawasaki also produces marine machinery and equipment, including main engines, propulsion systems, steering gears, deck and fishing machinery.

Kawasaki has shipyards at Kobe and Sakaide, Kagawa. (Kagawa Prefecture). The company also builds ships as a part of joint ventures with COSCO in China, i.e. the Nantong COSCO KHI Ship Engineering Co., Ltd.(NACKS), in Nantong, China, and the Dalian COSCO KHI Ship Engineering Co., Ltd.(DACKS), in Dalian, China.

Main products
 LNG carriers
 LPG carriers
 Container ships
 High speed vessels
 Submarines
 VLCCs (very large crude carriers)
 Bulk carriers
 Offshore structures
 Marine machinery and equipment

Energy plants and facilities
Kawasaki's key offering are high-performance gas turbines. The company is also involved in development of new energy sources as an alternative to fossil fuels such as wind power generation, biomass power generation, photovoltaic systems and rechargeable batteries.

Main products
 Small and medium-sized gas turbine generators
 Gas turbine cogeneration systems
 Gas engines
Diesel engines
 Wind turbine generators
 Ash handling systems
 Combined cycle power plants
 Nuclear power plant equipment
 Boilers

Industrial equipment

Kawasaki develops and builds a vast array of industrial plants and equipment, including large cement, chemical and nonferrous metal plants, prime movers, and compact precision machinery. It also offers industrial plant engineering from design to sales.

Kawasaki also develops automation systems. Industrial robots for processes such as assembly, handling, welding, painting and sealing, as well as automation systems for distribution and logistics such as automated product- and cargo-handling systems for plants and airports.

Main products
 Industrial plants
 Industrial robots
 Aerodynamic machinery
 Hydraulic equipment

Environment and recycling
Kawasaki is involved in the development of equipment that prevents pollution in a wide range of industries. Among the leading products are fuel gas desulfurization and denitrification systems, and ash handling systems. The company also supplies municipal refuse incineration plants, gasification and melting systems, sewage treatment and sludge incineration plants.

Kawasaki has also been developing systems that enable a wide range of municipal and industrial waste to be recovered, recycled and put to new use. Such systems include refuse paper and plastic fuel production facilities that convert wastepaper/plastics into an easy-to-handle solid fuel, equipment that converts old tires into highway paving materials and tiles, and machinery that sorts glass bottles by size and color.

Main products
 Municipal refuse incineration plants
 Water treatment systems
 Industrial waste recycling equipment
 Flue-gas desulfurization equipment

Infrastructure
Kawasaki's history of building steel structures spans more than a century, with bridge-building among its first businesses. The company offers of storage management for LNG,

Kawasaki's portfolio also includes retractable roofs, floors and other giant structures, the Sapporo Dome's retractable surface is one example.

For construction, Kawasaki produces products such as wheel loaders, tunnel machines, rollers, snowplows and purpose-specific loaders. The tunnel boring machines used to excavate the Channel Tunnel and the 14.14 m diameter shield machines used in the Tokyo Bay Aqua-Line construction are two well-known examples.

Main products
 Wheel loaders
 Construction machinery
 Shield Machines
 Tunnel boring machines
 Steel bridges
 LNG and LPG tanks
 Airport and port-related products
 Snowplows

Transportation

Kawasaki produces motorcycles, Jet Skis, ATVs and cars. Kawasaki's motorcycle include the Ninja sport bikes, and cruisers, dual-purpose and motocross motorcycles, as well as utility vehicles, ATVs and general-purpose gasoline engines. Kawasaki's "Jet Ski" has become a genericized trademark for any type of personal watercraft.

Affiliates and subsidiaries

Japan
 Akashi Ship Model Basin Co., Ltd.
 Alna Yusoki-Yohin Co., Ltd.
 Benic Solution Corp.
 EarthTechnica Co., Ltd.
 Enetec Co., Ltd.
 Fukae Powtec Corp.
 JP Steel Plantech Co.
 Kawaju Akashi Service Co., Ltd.
 Kawasaki Engineering Co., Ltd.
 Kawasaki Oita Manufacturing Co., Ltd.
 Kawasaki Metal Industries, Ltd.
 Kawasaki Setsubi Kogyo Co., Ltd.
 Kawasaki Shipbuilding Corporation
 Kawasaki Plant Systems, Ltd.
 Kawasaki Precision Machinery Ltd.
 Kawasaki Machine Systems, Ltd.
 Kawasaki Motors Corporation Japan
 Kawasaki Hydromechanics Corp.
 Kawasaki Life Corporation
 Kawasaki Naval Engine Service, Ltd.
 Kawaju Akashi Engineering Co., Ltd.
 KEE Environmental Construction, Co. Ltd.
 KEE Environmental Service, Ltd.
 Kawaju Gifu Service Co., Ltd.
 Kawaju Gifu Engineering Co., Ltd.
 Kawasaki Prime Mover Engineering Co., Ltd.
 Kawasaki Construction Co., Ltd.
 Kawasaki Rolling Stock Technology Co., Ltd.
 Kawaju Shoji Co., Ltd.
 Kawaju Techno Service Corp.
 Kawaju Tokyo Service Corp.
 Kawaju Facilitech Co., Ltd.
 Kawasaki Thermal Engineering Co., Ltd.
 K Career Partners Corp.
 K-GES Co., Ltd.
 K-Tec Corp.
 KGM (Kawaju Gifu Manufacturing) Co., Ltd.
 Kawasaki Setsubi Kogyo Co., Ltd.
 Kawasaki Construction Machinery, Hokkaido Ltd.
 Kawaju Sakaide Service Co., Ltd.
 Kawaju Kobe Support Co., Ltd.
 Kawaju Marine Engineering Co., Ltd.
 KHI JPS Co., Ltd.
 Kawasaki Shipbuilding Inspection Co., Ltd.
 Kawasaki Gas Turbine Research Center Ltd.
 Nichijo Manufacturing Co., Ltd.
 NIPPI Corporation
 Sapporo Kawasaki Rolling Stock Engineering Co., Ltd.
 Technica Corp.
 Union Precision Die Co., Ltd.

International

East Asia
 Kawasaki Marine Machinery Co. Ltd. (Wuhan, Hubei, China)
 Kawasaki Heavy Industries Ship Engineering Co. Ltd. (Nantong, Jiangsu, China; COSCO)
 Kawasaki Heavy Industries Machinery Trading Co. Ltd. (Shanghai, China)
 Kawasaki Heavy Industries Technology Co. Ltd. (Dalian, Liaoning, China)
 Kawasaki Precision Machinery (China) Ltd.
 Kawasaki Robotics Co. Ltd. (Tianjin, China)
 Kawasaki Heavy Industries Ltd. (Hong Kong)
 Kawasaki Machine Systems Ltd. (South Korea)

Europe
 Kawasaki Precision Machinery (U.K.) Limited
 Kawasaki Robotics (U.K.) Ltd.
 Kawasaki Robotics G.m.b.H.
 Kawasaki Gas Turbine Europe GmbH
 Kawasaki Motors Europe N.V.
 Kawasaki Heavy Industries Europe Finance B.V.
 Kawasaki Heavy Industries (Europe) B.V.
 Italian Motorcycle Investment S.p.A.

North America

 Canadian Kawasaki Motors Inc.
 Kawasaki Construction Machinery Corp. of America
 Kawasaki Heavy Industries (U.S.A.), Inc.
 Kawasaki Motors Corp., U.S.A.
 Kawasaki Motors Manufacturing Corp., U.S.A.
 Kawasaki Precision Machinery (U.S.A.), Inc.
 Kawasaki Rail Car, Inc.
 Kawasaki Robotics (U.S.A.), Inc.

Oceania
 Kawasaki Motors Pty. Ltd.

South America
 Kawasaki do Brasil Indústria e Comércio Ltda.
 Kawasaki Machinery do Brasil Maq. Equip. Ltda.
 Kawasaki Motores do Brasil Ltda.
 Estaleiro Enseada do Paraguaçu S.A.

South Asia
 India Kawasaki Motors (India)
 Kawasaki Motors (Bangladesh)

Southeast Asia
 Kawasaki Gas Turbine Asia Sdn. Bhd. (Malaysia)
 Kawasaki Motors (Malaysia) Sdn. Bhd. (Malaysia)
 Kawasaki Heavy Industries Pte. Ltd. (Singapore)
 Kawasaki Motors Enterprise Co. Ltd. (Thailand)
 KDT (KHI Design & Technical Service, Inc. (Pasay, Philippines)
 Kawasaki Motors Philippines (Muntinlupa, Philippines)
 P.T. Kawasaki Motor (Indonesia)

References

External links
 

 
Conglomerate companies of Japan
Defense companies of Japan
Locomotive manufacturers of Japan
Truck manufacturers of Japan
Motorcycle manufacturers of Japan
Rolling stock manufacturers of Japan
Shipbuilding companies of Japan
Aircraft manufacturers of Japan
Aircraft engine manufacturers of Japan
Aerospace companies of Japan
Gas turbine manufacturers
Robotics companies of Japan
Keiretsu
Zaibatsu
Multinational companies headquartered in Japan
Manufacturing companies based in Kobe
Vehicle manufacturing companies established in 1896
Japanese companies established in 1896
Companies listed on the Tokyo Stock Exchange
Conglomerate companies established in 1896
Diesel engine manufacturers
Marine engine manufacturers
Motorcycle engine manufacturers
Engine manufacturers of Japan
Construction equipment manufacturers of Japan
Gas engine manufacturers
Pump manufacturers
Electric motor manufacturers
Manufacturers of industrial automation
Industrial robotics companies